Ian Roy Ballinger (21 October 1925 – 24 December 2008) was a New Zealand shooter who won a bronze medal at the 1968 Summer Olympics. Ballinger competed at three consecutive Olympic Games (1968, 1972 and 1976) and two Commonwealth Games (1974 and 1978) in the 50m Rifle - prone event.

He was awarded the Lonsdale Cup by the New Zealand Olympic Committee in 1968, and the following year he won the Ballinger Belt (named for his great uncle, turn-of-the-century shooting champion Arthur Ballinger) at the New Zealand rifle shooting championships.

References

1925 births
2008 deaths
Sportspeople from New Plymouth
ISSF rifle shooters
New Zealand male sport shooters
Olympic bronze medalists for New Zealand
Olympic shooters of New Zealand
Shooters at the 1968 Summer Olympics
Shooters at the 1972 Summer Olympics
Shooters at the 1976 Summer Olympics
Commonwealth Games competitors for New Zealand
Shooters at the 1974 British Commonwealth Games
Shooters at the 1978 Commonwealth Games
Olympic medalists in shooting
Medalists at the 1968 Summer Olympics